The following is a list of notable people associated with University of South Dakota, located in the American city of Vermillion, South Dakota.

Notable alumni

Academia
Kay Schallenkamp, president of Emporia State University, and later Black Hills State University
Robert Legvold, former director of the Harriman Institute, Columbia University Sovietologist

Politics and government

 James Abourezk, U.S. Senator and U.S. Representative from South Dakota, first Arab-American U.S. Senator
 Sigurd Anderson, Governor of South Dakota
 Joseph H. Bottum,  27th Lieutenant Governor of South Dakota and a member of the United States Senate
 Kevin Brady, U.S. Representative from Texas
 Dwight W. Burney, 30th Governor of Nebraska
 Dan Crippen, Director of the Congressional Budget Office
 Dennis Daugaard, 32nd Governor of South Dakota
 George E. "Bud" Day, retired Air Force colonel, ex-POW, and most highly decorated military officer since Douglas MacArthur
 Frank Farrar, 24th governor of South Dakota
 Joe Foss, fighter ace, Governor of South Dakota, television personality, commissioner of the American Football League, and president of the National Rifle Association
 Carl Gunderson, Governor of South Dakota
 Charles R. Hayes, Justice of the South Dakota Supreme Court
 Daryl Hecht, Justice of the Iowa Supreme Court
 Carole Hillard, Lieutenant Governor of South Dakota
 Dusty Johnson, U.S. Representative and PUC Commissioner 
 Marty Jackley, 30th Attorney General of South Dakota
 Bill Janklow, Governor of South Dakota and Representative of South Dakota
 Leslie Jensen, Governor of South Dakota
 Tim Johnson, U.S. senator from South Dakota
 Steve T. Kirby, Lieutenant Governor of South Dakota
 Roberto Lange, Judge of U.S. District Court of South Dakota
 Richard Barrett Lowe, Governor of American Samoa and Governor of Guam
 Matt Michels, current Lieutenant Governor of South Dakota
 George S. Mickelson, Governor of South Dakota
 John C. Miller Jr., United States Marine Corps Brigadier General
 Byron S. Payne, South Dakota Attorney General
 Larry Pressler, U.S. Representative and Senator from South Dakota
 Merrell Q. Sharpe, Attorney General of South Dakota from 1929 through 1933, and Governor of South Dakota from 1943 through 1947
 Harold J. Sykora, National Guard Major General, Adjutant General of South Dakota
 John Thune, U.S. senator from South Dakota

Athletics
 Dwight Anderson, cornerback and 2010 CFL All-Star
 Ordell Braase, 1957–68, drafted in 14th round by the Baltimore Colts, two-time All-Pro, NFL Players Association President
 George Burnside, former Racine Legion blocking back
 Matt Chatham, former NFL linebacker, (2000–05, New England Patriots, 2006–07, New York Jets)
 Tom Compton, offensive lineman for the Washington Redskins
 Jack Doyle, former athletic director, former men's basketball coach, former assistant men's basketball coach, inducted into the USD Athletic Hall of Fame 2002, member of the National Association of Collegiate Directors of Athletics (NACDA) Hall of Fame
 Filip Filipović, former NFL punter (2002–2003 Dallas Cowboys, 2003–2004 San Francisco 49ers, 2004 Minnesota Vikings, 2006 Houston Texans, 2007 Chicago Bears)
 Emily Grove, pole vaulter
 John Kohler, former offensive lineman, drafted in the 3rd Round, 1969, Denver Broncos
 Greg Lansing, basketball head coach, Indiana State
 Stefan Logan, return specialist for Detroit Lions
 Mark McLoughlin, former Calgary Stampeders kicker
 Derek Miles, pole vaulter for USA Track and Field and Olympian
 Ko Quaye, defensive lineman for the Orlando Predators of the Arena Football League
 Joe Robbie, original owner of the Miami Dolphins franchise
 A.J. Schable, defensive end for NFL Seattle Seahawks; 2006, Arizona Cardinals
 Josh Stamer, former NFL linebacker. (2003–07, Buffalo Bills; 2008, Tennessee Titans; 2009, Cleveland Browns, Buffalo Bills)
 Tyler Starr, Atlanta Falcons linebacker, drafted 255th overall in 7th round of 2014 NFL Draft
 Johnny Vann, former defensive back, drafted in the 10th round, Washington Redskins, 1973–74
 Jamel White, former running back (1999, Indianapolis Colts; 1999, Cleveland Browns; 2004, Tampa Bay Buccaneers; 2005, Detroit Lions)

Other

Norman H. Boke, botanist
Ernest Bormann, rhetorical theorist
Tom Brokaw, longtime NBC News anchorman and retired NBC Nightly News anchor
Pete Dexter, novelist
Ernest O. Lawrence, inventor of the cyclotron; winner of 1939 Nobel Prize for Physics; namesake of chemical element 103, lawrencium; participated in the Manhattan Project;
John H. Lawrence, physicist and physician recognized for pioneering work in nuclear medicine; often referred to as the father of modern nuclear medicine
Kenneth J. Meier, Charles Gregory Professor of Political Science, Texas A&M University
Greg Mortenson, humanitarian and founder of the Central Asia Institute
Al Neuharth, founder of USA Today and the Freedom Forum, former CEO of Gannett
Pat O'Brien, television presenter
Earl Rose, Dallas County medical examiner at the time of the assassination of John F. Kennedy
Faith Spotted Eagle, Yankton Dakota counselor and activist
Gene Vidal, athlete, aviation pioneer, New Deal official and father of Gore Vidal
Anna Johnson Pell Wheeler, mathematician, known for her contributions to infinite dimensional linear algebra
Abby Whiteside, piano teacher and theorist

Faculty

 Roger Baron, professor of law 
 William O. Farber, former professor of political science
 Oscar Howe, Native American painter
 Patrick Garry, professor of law
 Arne B. Larson, founder and curator of the National Music Museum or "Shrine to Music"
 Alexander Pell (known in Russia as Sergey Degayev), first Dean of the School of Engineering (1905); researcher in mathematics
Frank Pommersheim, professor of law

See also

 South Dakota Coyotes

References

External links
 University of South Dakota Alumni Association

University of South Dakota people